TwickFolk (previously known as Twickenham Folk Club) organises acoustic music events in and around Twickenham, south-west London. A registered charity, it is run, not for profit, by a small group of volunteers. It was established in January 1983 and is now one of the best known and most highly respected folk clubs in London and the South East of England.

TwickFolk organises gigs on Sunday evenings, usually at the Patchworks music venue at The Cabbage Patch pub in London Road, Twickenham, featuring British and North American acoustic folk and roots-based music in a programme that includes blues, country music and Americana as well as traditional folk music. The evening usually consists of a main "guest" preceded by a support act or several floor spots.

Occasionally TwickFolk organises singers' nights. These consist of either several performed floor spots or an unplugged singaround where everyone sits in a circle and those who want to sing or play an instrument can take turns to do so. TwickFolk has also organised workshops on building a cigar box guitar and on playing guitar and nyckelharpa.

TwickFolk has also held charity fundraising nights benefiting national and local charities.

Broadcasts
In March 2014 BBC Radio Wales marked the Six Nations rugby tournament by broadcasting live, from Isleworth's Red Lion pub, a concert, Twickenham Heartbeat, in its folk roots and acoustic music programme Celtic Heartbeat.  Hosted by Frank Hennessy and Bethan Elfyn, it featured performers from TwickFolk, and special guests including Ralph McTell.

Recordings
Noel Murphy's CD A Session was recorded live, with The Mahogany Gaspipes, in a folk session at The Cabbage Patch pub in 1997.

Guests
Guests who have appeared at TwickFolk include Nels Andrews, Les Barker, Sally Barker, Alyssa Bonagura, Maggie Boyle and Paul Downes, Chuck Brodsky, The Carrivick Sisters, Olivia Chaney,  Charlie Dore and Julian Littman, Kris Drever, Gareth Dunlop, Ana Egge, Carrie Elkin, Mark Erelli, Stephen Fearing, David Francey, Vin Garbutt, Dick Gaughan, Melissa Greener, Jack Harris, Hatful of Rain, Rebecca Hollweg, Luke Jackson, Robb Johnson, Diana Jones, Kara, Sam Kelly Trio, Lau, Sarah McQuaid, Madison Violet, Emily Maguire, Iain Matthews, Megson, Jim Moray, Jess Morgan, Elliott Morris, Pete Morton, O'Hooley & Tidow, Earl Okin, Ellis Paul, Rod Picott, Rebecca Pronsky, Kim Richey, Justin Rutledge, Southern Tenant Folk Union, Sunjay, Miranda Sykes, Greg Trooper, Kevin Welch, Dan Wilde, Brian Willoughby and Chris Wood.

Gallery

Notes and references

External links
 Official website: TwickFolk
  Official website: The Cabbage Patch pub
 Highlights from previous TwickFolk events

1983 establishments in England
Arts charities
Arts organisations based in England
Arts organizations established in 1983
Charities based in London
Clubs and societies in London
Folk music organizations
Folk music venues
Music charities based in the United Kingdom
Music in the London Borough of Richmond upon Thames
Music venues in London
Organisations based in the London Borough of Richmond upon Thames
Twickenham